Libice may refer to several places in the Czech Republic:
 Libice nad Cidlinou, village in Nymburk District
 Libice nad Doubravou, market town in Havlíčkův Brod District